Christopher John Wilder (born 23 September 1967) is an English professional football manager and former player who played as a right-back. He is currently the manager of EFL Championship club Watford.

His extensive professional playing career saw spells at Sheffield United (twice), Rotherham United, Notts County, Bradford City, Brighton & Hove Albion and Halifax Town. He also had loan spells at five clubs.

After retiring, he became a manager and was in charge of Alfreton Town, Halifax Town (their last manager before liquidation), Oxford United and Northampton Town before his appointment at Sheffield United. He won promotion from the Conference Premier with Oxford via the play-offs in 2010, from League Two as champions with Northampton in 2016, from League One with Sheffield United as champions in 2017, and from the Championship with the same club two years later.

Early life
Christopher John Wilder was born on 23 September 1967 in Stocksbridge, West Riding of Yorkshire.

Playing career
Wilder started his football career as a trainee at Southampton and was released without making it into the first team.

He moved on to Sheffield United in August 1986. In December 1987, defender Wilder was sent off for a crude tackle on Milwall's Jimmy Carter in a season which saw the Sheffield club relegated to the third division. The following season Wilder was on the receiving end, being elbowed in the face. Swansea's Bryan Wade received a three match ban for violent conduct as a result. Wilder was a regular in the team that finished second and therefore clinched promotion back to the second division at the first attempt in the 1988–89 season, and was also part of the squad that gained a further promotion the season after, this time back to the first division, after an absence of fourteen years. Wilder was a regular during the following season back in the first division, but thereafter found appearances harder to come by, hence Wilder left for nearby Rotherham United in 1992, staying for a further four years and amassing his largest number of games and goals for one club.

In 1998 Wilder returned to Sheffield United, and a year later he was brought to Brighton by Micky Adams before joining Halifax Town that same year.

Managerial career

Alfreton Town
Wilder began his career in management at Alfreton Town. He took over at the club in late October 2001 and in the 27 weeks he was in charge won four trophies: the Northern Counties (East) League Premier Division, the League Cup, the President's Cup and the Derbyshire Senior Cup.

Halifax Town
Wilder returned to Halifax Town as manager on 2 July 2002. He replaced caretaker manager Neil Redfearn, who had in turn replaced Alan Little (who left on 8 April after falling ill with appendicitis in March). Halifax had been relegated to the Conference at the end of the season.

Wilder was in charge at Halifax for more than 300 games until the club went into liquidation on 30 June 2008, and he decided to join former Halifax defender Alan Knill, as the assistant manager of Bury.

Oxford United
After fewer than six months at Gigg Lane, Wilder was appointed as the manager of Conference National club Oxford United on 21 December 2008 (replacing Jim Smith who had been caretaker  manager in the wake of Darren Patterson's sacking), where he only just missed out on a play-off place in his first season. Wilder's first full season in charge of Oxford began successfully and by mid-season they were top of the Conference table by five points with a game in hand. However, Oxford were overtaken by Stevenage, who would go on to win the title and take the automatic promotion place, consigning the Us to the playoffs with Luton Town, Rushden & Diamonds and York City. They defeated Rushden & Diamonds to reach the play-off final, and gained promotion to the Football League by beating York City 3–1.

In their first season back in the Football League in four years, Wilder guided Oxford to mid-table safety. The team finished 12th, in the top half of the table, their highest finish in seven years. The next season Oxford finished ninth, after poor form late in the season led to the team dropping out of the play-off position they had occupied for most of the year. Oxford's chairman Kelvin Thomas gave Wilder his backing, meaning he would remain manager for the 2012–13 season. Despite failing to achieve a play-off place again in Oxford's third season back in the League, and intense speculation about his future at the club, Wilder was offered and accepted a further one-year contract for the 2013–14 season.

On 26 January 2014 he resigned as Oxford manager with the intention of joining League Two rivals Northampton Town as their manager.

Northampton Town
On 27 January 2014, Wilder was appointed manager of Northampton Town, signing a three-and-a-half year contract. Wilder successfully battled against relegation to the Conference, after taking over the club in the relegation zone in League 2. He led the side to a mid-table finish in the 2014–15 season, and then to the League Two title the following season with 99 points, despite significant financial difficulties at the club resulting in players and staff not being paid during October and November 2015.

Sheffield United
On 12 May 2016, Wilder joined his boyhood club Sheffield United as their new manager on a three-year contract, following the parting of company with Nigel Adkins. In the pre-season, despite little financial backing, he was able to bring some new players in, many of which were free transfers. He then made Sheffield born Billy Sharp club captain. However, Wilder's League One managerial debut got off to a poor start, only gaining a single point from the first four games, which left Sheffield United at the bottom of League One. Despite this, the club pushed on and went on to become League One Champions, securing 100 points in the process, a club record.

His second season was full of highs and few lows. His managerial Championship debut against Brentford ended in a 1–0 win for Sheffield United. Then in September 2017, United beat city rivals Sheffield Wednesday 4–2 at Hillsborough, a record for goals scored by United against Wednesday at Hillsborough. By the end of October, after beating local rivals Leeds United 2–1 at Elland Road, Sheffield United were top of the Championship.

On 28 April 2019, it was confirmed that Wilder had led the Blades to the Premier League following nearest rival Leeds' 1–1 draw at home. This ensured his second promotion in just three years at the club. This achievement earned him the LMA Manager of the Year award.

In July 2019, Wilder signed a new three-year contract with the club. On 10 January 2020, Wilder signed a four-year contract extension with the club. Sheffield United went on to finish ninth in their first season back in the top flight, their best since 1991–92.

On 13 March 2021, Wilder left the club by mutual consent, with the club bottom of the Premier League, with 14 points from 28 games.

Middlesbrough 
On 7 November 2021, Wilder was appointed manager of Middlesbrough after the club parted ways with Neil Warnock. After an unbeaten month which saw Boro win four out of their five matches, Wilder was awarded the EFL Championship Manager of the Month award for December 2021 with his wing-back Isaiah Jones winning the Player of the Month award.
Wilder was sacked on 3 October 2022 with the club in the bottom three of the Championship. They had won only two of 11 league games played in the 2022–23 season.

Watford 
On 7 March 2023, Wilder was appointed manager of Watford on a contract until the end of the season.

Career statistics
Source:

Managerial statistics

Honours

Player
Individual
PFA Team of the Year: 1995–96 Second Division

Manager
Alfreton Town
Northern Counties East Football League Premier Division: 2001–02
Northern Counties East Football League League Cup: 2001–02
Northern Counties East Football League President's Cup: 2001–02
Derbyshire Senior Cup: 2001–02

Halifax Town
West Riding County Cup: 2003–04

Oxford United
Conference Premier play-offs: 2010

Northampton Town
Football League Two: 2015–16

Sheffield United
EFL League One: 2016–17
EFL Championship runner-up: 2018–19

Individual
Football Conference Manager of the Month: January 2003
The Football League / EFL Manager of the Season: 2015–16,2018–19
LMA League Two Manager of the Year: 2015–16
LMA League One Manager of the Year: 2016–17
LMA Special Achievement Award: 2016–17
LMA Championship Manager of the Year: 2018–19
LMA Manager of the Year: 2018–19
EFL Championship Manager of the Month: February 2019, April 2019, December 2021
EFL League One Manager of the Month: April 2017

 Football League Two Manager of the Month: January 2015, November 2015, January 2016, February 2016

References

External links

Lincoln City F.C. Official Archive Profile

1967 births
Living people
People from Stocksbridge
English footballers
Association football defenders
Southampton F.C. players
Sheffield United F.C. players
Walsall F.C. players
Charlton Athletic F.C. players
Leyton Orient F.C. players
Rotherham United F.C. players
Notts County F.C. players
Bradford City A.F.C. players
Northampton Town F.C. players
Lincoln City F.C. players
Brighton & Hove Albion F.C. players
Halifax Town A.F.C. players
English Football League players
English football managers
Alfreton Town F.C. managers
Halifax Town A.F.C. managers
Oxford United F.C. managers
Northampton Town F.C. managers
Sheffield United F.C. managers
Middlesbrough F.C. managers
National League (English football) managers
English Football League managers
Premier League managers
Association football coaches
Bury F.C. non-playing staff